The Donne River is a river in the Southland Region of New Zealand. It arises in the Darran Mountains, and flows south-west to join the Cleddau River. State Highway 94 crosses the Donne just before it reaches the Cleddau. The river was named by W. G. Grave in 1907 after Thomas Edward Donne, the General Manager of the Tourism Department.

See also
List of rivers of New Zealand

References

Land Information New Zealand - Search for Place Names

Rivers of Fiordland